Maame Ewusi-Mensah Frimpong (  Maame Abena Famanyame Ewusi-Mensah; born 1976) is an American attorney and judge serving as a United States district judge of the United States District Court for the Central District of California. She is a former judge of the Los Angeles County Superior Court.

Early life and education 
Frimpong was born in 1976 in Los Angeles and raised in Los Angeles County, California to Kwaku Ewusi-Mensah and Theodora Ewusi-Mensah, immigrants from Ghana. She attended the Vivian Webb School for Girls in Claremont, California, graduating as valedictorian of her class in 1993. Frimpong received a Bachelor of Arts from Harvard University in 1997 and a Juris Doctor from Yale Law School in 2001.

Career 
After graduating from Harvard, Frimpong worked as a public high school teacher in Ghana. From 2001 to 2002, Frimpong served as a law clerk for Judge Stephen Reinhardt of the United States Court of Appeals for the Ninth Circuit. She then worked as an associate at Morrison & Foerster from 2002 to 2007. From 2007 to 2015, she served in various positions in the United States Department of Justice, including in the Civil Division. In 2015, Frimpong became vice president, general counsel and corporate secretary of the Millennium Challenge Corporation.

In 2015, she was appointed by Governor Jerry Brown to serve as a judge of the Los Angeles County Superior Court to fill the vacancy left by the retirement of Thomas R. White.

Federal judicial service 
On September 8, 2021, President Joe Biden announced his intent to nominate Frimpong to serve as a United States district judge of the United States District Court for the Central District of California. On September 20, 2021, her nomination was sent to the Senate. President Biden nominated Frimpong to the seat vacated by Judge Christina A. Snyder, who assumed senior status on November 23, 2016. On October 20, 2021, a hearing on her nomination was held before the Senate Judiciary Committee. On December 2, 2021, her nomination was reported out of committee by a 12–10 vote. On December 17, 2021, the United States Senate invoked cloture on her nomination by a 47–24 vote. Her nomination was confirmed later that day by a 46–24 vote. She received her judicial commission on February 7, 2022.

See also 
 List of African-American federal judges
 List of African-American jurists

References

External links 

1976 births
Living people
21st-century American judges
21st-century American lawyers
21st-century American women lawyers
21st-century American women judges
American people of Ghanaian descent
California lawyers
California state court judges
Harvard University alumni
Judges of the United States District Court for the Central District of California
Lawyers from Los Angeles
People associated with Morrison & Foerster
Superior court judges in the United States
United States district court judges appointed by Joe Biden
Yale Law School alumni